Pitcairnia filispina is a species of flowering plant in the family Bromeliaceae, endemic to Venezuela. It was first described by Lyman Bradford Smith in 1957.

References

filispina
Flora of Venezuela
Plants described in 1957